Katyal is an Indian Khatri surname. Katyals originally belonged to Jhang district especially in the town of Chiniot where they were rich zamindars. In the Jhang city, a mohalla dedicated to Katyals as well as Maghu Khatris is present near the Chowk Bazar.

Notable people 
Akhil Katyal (born 1985), Indian poet
Nand Katyal (born 1935), Indian artist
Neal Katyal (born 1970), Indian-American lawyer
Rupin Katyal (1974/75–1999), Indian hijacking victim during the Indian Airlines flight 814 hijacking
Vilayati Ram Katyal (1935–1988), Indian politician

References 

Indian surnames
Punjabi-language surnames
Surnames of Indian origin
Hindu surnames
Khatri clans
Khatri surnames